Young Heart may refer to:

 Young Heart (Birdy album), 2021
Young Heart, an album by Blondfire, 2014

See also
Young Hearts (disambiguation)